Dio was an American heavy metal band centred around vocalist Ronnie James Dio. Formed in 1982, the group originally consisted of Dio, guitarist Jake E. Lee (replaced by Vivian Campbell for the first active lineup of the band), bassist Jimmy Bain and drummer Vinny Appice. The band's final lineup, active until Dio's death on May 16, 2010, included guitarist Craig Goldy, drummer Simon Wright, keyboardist Scott Warren and bassist Rudy Sarzo.

History
Dio was formed in October 1982 by vocalist Ronnie James Dio and drummer Vinny Appice following their departure from Black Sabbath. For the first lineup, the pair worked with Rough Cutt guitarist Jake E. Lee for around six weeks, before parting ways due to stylistic differences. Preferring to work with British musicians, Dio approached former Wild Horses bassist Jimmy Bain for suggestions of a replacement; he recommended Sweet Savage guitarist Vivian Campbell, and the pair joined the group. Around the release of the band's debut Holy Diver in May 1983, Claude Schnell joined as Dio's first full-time keyboardist. After two more studio albums – The Last in Line and Sacred Heart – as well as live release Intermission, Campbell left the band in March 1986. He was replaced by former Giuffria guitarist Craig Goldy.

Goldy remained for just one new album, Dream Evil, before leaving Dio due to "musical differences" in August 1988. After "hundreds" of submissions from guitarists worldwide, Rowan Robertson was chosen as Goldy's replacement in May 1989. A few months later, Bain and Schnell were replaced by Teddy Cook and Jens Johansson, respectively. In December, Appice also left Dio, with Simon Wright leaving AC/DC to take his place early the next year. The new lineup recorded and released their only album Lock Up the Wolves in 1990. The following January, Dio returned to Black Sabbath.

By November 1992, Dio and Appice had left Black Sabbath for a second time. They reformed Dio and added new guitarist Tracy G and bassist Jeff Pilson early the following year, after initially working with original member Bain. After recording Strange Highways, the group returned to a five-piece with the addition of Scott Warren on keyboards. Pilson remained until the end of the album's tour in late 1994, when he rejoined Dokken, although he contributed to the 1996 release Angry Machines. Larry "Bones" Dennison replaced him for the next tour, which spawned the live release Inferno: Last in Live. In February 1997, Appice was replaced for a run of shows by James Kottak, after being hospitalised for pneumonia. He was also next to leave Dio permanently, when he toured with Black Sabbath from June 1998.

Appice was replaced, again, by Simon Wright. The following year, former members Goldy and Bain also returned. Again, Goldy only lasted one album – 2000's Magica – before he was replaced by Doug Aldrich in January 2002. The new guitarist recorded Killing the Dragon, but by early 2003 had left due to "scheduling conflicts" with his other group Whitesnake. Aldrich was originally set to be replaced by Ratt guitarist Warren DeMartini, however he was replaced within a month by the returning Goldy. Bain also left in early 2004. Pilson returned to perform on Master of the Moon, with former Ozzy Osbourne bassist Rudy Sarzo taking over on tour from July. Aldrich would later return to fill in for Goldy on tour in 2005 due to an arm injury, and again in 2009 due to scheduling conflicts with Budgie.

On May 16, 2010, Ronnie James Dio died of stomach cancer, marking the end of his eponymous band. All four other members went on to form Dio Disciples with former Judas Priest frontman Tim "Ripper" Owens in 2011, while original members Appice, Campbell, Bain and Schnell formed Last in Line with former Lynch Mob vocalist Andrew Freeman in 2012.

Members

Final lineup

Other members

Live substitutes

Timeline

Lineups

References

External links
Ronnie James Dio official website

Dio